Johan Abram Persson, (13 July 1898 – 24 February 1971) was a Swedish cross-country skier, fisherman, craftsman and wolfhunter.

Competing for Arjeplogs SK in club competitions and for Sweden in international events, he won Vasaloppet in 1929.

Cross-country skiing results

World Championships

References 

1898 births
1971 deaths
Swedish male cross-country skiers
Vasaloppet winners